Didier Hoyer (born 3 February 1961) is a French sprint canoer who competed from the early 1980s to the early 1990s. Competing in three Summer Olympics, he won two bronze medals in the C-2 1000 m event, earning them in 1984 and 1992.

Hoyer also won six medals at the ICF Canoe Sprint World Championships with four silvers (C-2 1000 m: 1989, 1991, 1993; C-2 10000 m: 1989) and two bronzes (C-1 10000 m: 1986, C-2 500 m: 1991).

References

1961 births
Canoeists at the 1984 Summer Olympics
Canoeists at the 1988 Summer Olympics
Canoeists at the 1992 Summer Olympics
French male canoeists
Living people
Olympic canoeists of France
Olympic bronze medalists for France
Olympic medalists in canoeing
ICF Canoe Sprint World Championships medalists in Canadian
Medalists at the 1992 Summer Olympics
Medalists at the 1984 Summer Olympics
Mediterranean Games medalists in canoeing
Mediterranean Games gold medalists for France
Competitors at the 1991 Mediterranean Games